Nemam razloga za strah (I Have No Reason for Fear) is the fifth studio album by Bosnian pop singer Donna Ares. It was released 9 February 2006 through Hayat Production.

Track listing

Personnel

Instruments

Dalida Dikić – backing vocals (1, 2, 3, 4, 5, 6, 7, 9)
Kenan Mačković – backing vocals (1, 2, 4)
Željko Krišto – synthesizer (1)
Muhamed Šehić Hamić – accordion, keyboards (2)
Elvir Ramić – bass guitar (2), bass (9)
Aladin Kečalović – drums (2, 9)
Džavid Ljubovci – guitar (2, 3, 9), bouzouki(7)
Sanel Kabiljagić – trumpet (2)
Dinko Mujatović – accordion (8)

Production and recording

Donna Ares – arranging (7)
Hamdija Mešić – arrangement (4, 9)
Nino M – arrangement (1, 5, 7, 8)
Džavid Ljubovci – mastering, arrangement, mixing

Crew

Donna Ares – design
Džavid Ljubovci – photography

References

2006 albums
Donna Ares albums
Hayat Production albums